"You Should Have Known" is a song performed by Laura White. It was released on 9 November 2009 in the United Kingdom as the first single from White's upcoming debut album.

The song premiered on White's official website with three other album tracks. Fans then had the chance to log onto the website and vote for their favourite song to be White's debut single. "You Should Have Known" thus won the poll and became the single. It reached No. 32 on the UK Singles Chart on 8 November on the basis of digital downloads but dropped to No. 53 in its second week on the chart.

Promotion
White performed the song on GMTV in August 2009. She appeared briefly on BBC2 children's TV show TMi on 31 October 2009 to promote the single. White also hosted an edition of chart show's Daily Fix. She also appeared on the ITV show, Loose Women, performed on The Alan Titchmarsh Show and had an interview on BBC Breakfast on 2 November 2009.
Meanwhile, press-wise, in November 2009, she did a musically-significant interview with noted UK R&B writer Pete Lewis of the award-winning 'Blues & Soul'.

Chart performance
The song entered the UK Singles Chart on 8 November 2009 at number 32. It was the lowest new entry of the week in the UK Top 40 and was at No. 2 in the UK Indie Singles Chart.  The song peaked at # 70 on the Polish Music Charts on download sales only, despite no promotion in Poland.

Track listings
Digital download
"You Should Have Known" – 3:12

Digital download
"You Should Have Known" (Industrial R&B Mix) – 3:28

Digital download
"You Should Have Known" (Oracle Radio Mix) – 3:08

Digital download
"You Should Have Known" (Oracle Radio Mix) – 3:07
"You Should Have Known" (Oracle Extended Vocal Mix) – 7:53
"You Should Have Known" (Oracle Dub) – 6:50

Release history

Credits
 Executive Producer – Richard Pierce
 Mastered By – Mark Newman
 Producer [Vocal Production], Backing Vocals [Additional] – Michelle Escoffery
 Producer, Mixed By – Ian Green
 Written-By – Ian Green, Michelle Escoffery

References

2009 singles
2009 songs